Blabia exotica is a species of beetle in the family Cerambycidae. It was described by Martins and Galileo in 1995. It is known from Colombia.

References

Blabia
Beetles described in 1995